Chilkur may refer to

 Chilkur Balaji Temple
 Chilkur, Ranga Reddy district
 Chilkur, Suryapet district